The following is a list of the MTV Europe Music Award winners and nominees for Best Russian Act. The all-time winner in this category are Dima Bilan with 8 wins.

Winners and nominees

Winners are listed first and highlighted in bold.

1990s

2000s

2010s

2020s

Local Hero Award — Russia

See also 
 MTV VMA International Viewer's Choice Award for MTV Russia
 MTV Russia Music Awards

References

MTV Europe Music Awards
Russian music awards
Awards established in 2001